The 2018 Irving Tennis Classic was a professional tennis tournament played on hard courts. It was the seventh edition of the tournament which was part of the 2018 ATP Challenger Tour. It took place in Irving, Texas, United States between 13 and 18 March 2018.

Singles main-draw entrants

Seeds

 1 Rankings as of March 5, 2018.

Other entrants
The following players received wildcards into the singles main draw:
  Alex de Minaur
  Thomas Fabbiano
  Márton Fucsovics
  Philipp Petzschner

The following players received entry into the singles main draw as alternates:
  Matteo Berrettini
  Sebastian Fanselow
  Bjorn Fratangelo
  Daniel Elahi Galán
  Austin Krajicek
  Peđa Krstin
  Michael Mmoh
  Tim Smyczek
  Sergiy Stakhovsky
  Elias Ymer

The following players received entry from the qualifying draw:
  Petros Chrysochos
  Patrick Kypson
  Or Ram-Harel
  Arthur Rinderknech

The following players received entry as lucky losers:
  Tigre Hank
  Jody Maginley

Champions

Singles

 Mikhail Kukushkin def.  Matteo Berrettini 6–2, 3–6, 6–1.

Doubles

 Philipp Petzschner /  Alexander Peya def.  Radu Albot /  Matthew Ebden 6–2, 6–4.

External links
Official Website

2018 ATP Challenger Tour
2018